Aleksi Saarela (born 7 January 1997) is a Finnish professional ice hockey forward who is currently playing with the SCL Tigers of the National League (NL). He was originally selected 89th overall in the 2015 NHL Entry Draft by the New York Rangers.

Playing career
Saarela made his SM-liiga debut playing with Lukko during the 2012–13 SM-liiga season. On 28 February 2016, the rights to Saarela, along with a 2016 second-round draft pick and a 2017 second-round draft pick, were traded from the New York Rangers to the Carolina Hurricanes in exchange for Eric Staal.

In the 2015–16 season, Saarela led Porin Ässät with 20 goals and finished third in overal scoring with 33 points in 51 games. On 20 April 2016, he signed a one-year contract to return to his original club, Lukko, on a one-year contract. Under two months later, on 13 June 2016, Saarela was then signed to a three-year entry-level contract with the Carolina Hurricanes.

On 3 January 2018, Saarela was recalled by the Carolina Hurricanes from the Charlotte Checkers prior to a game with the Pittsburgh Penguins. However, it was short lived as he was sent back down days later without playing a game.

He made his NHL debut during game five of the Hurricanes' first round playoff series against the Washington Capitals.

On June 24, 2019, Saarela was traded by the Hurricanes, along with Calvin de Haan, to the Chicago Blackhawks in exchange for Gustav Forsling and Anton Forsberg.

Saarela participated in the Blackhawks 2019 training camp, before he was reassigned to begin the 2019–20 season in the AHL with the Rockford IceHogs. Unable to crack Chicago's roster, Saarela requested a trade and after just 5 games with the IceHogs Saarela was dealt by the Blackhawks to the Florida Panthers in exchange for Ian McCoshen on October 23, 2019. He was directly assigned to report to the Panthers' AHL affiliate, the Springfield Thunderbirds.

On 22 August 2020, following the Panthers' elimination from the 2020 Stanley Cup playoffs, Saarela returned to original club, Lukko of the Liiga, as a restricted free agent from the Panthers due to the delayed 2020–21 North American season.

On August 6, 2021, Saarela agreed to a one-year deal with the SCL Tigers of the National League (NL).

Career statistics

Regular season and playoffs

International

Awards and honors

References

External links

1997 births
Living people
Ässät players
Carolina Hurricanes players
Charlotte Checkers (2010–) players
Finnish ice hockey centres
Florida Panthers players
Lukko players
New York Rangers draft picks
Rockford IceHogs (AHL) players
SCL Tigers players
Ice hockey people from Helsinki
Springfield Thunderbirds players